Strahinja is a Serbian given name. The name is pagan and dates back to medieval Serbia, where it is first attested in 1322 as 'Страхинья'. 

The meaning of the word strah is 'fear' (from Proto-Slavic *straxъ), and -inja is an augmentative. Strahinja thus means 'Great Fear, Dread, or Horror'.

Nicknames can include Strale, Straja, Strajo, Straha, Straho, Stašo, Staško, Strašo, Straško, Strajin, Strajan, Strajko, Strahac, Strahinjica and Strajovina (Ctraja-Ctrlaja).

People

Strahinja Banović is the protagonist of the eponymous Serbian epic poem and film; he may be identified with the historical figure Đurađ II Stracimirović Balšić.
Strahinja Jovančević, Serbian long jumper
Strahinja Lazović, Serbian squash player
Strahinja Milošević, Serbian basketball player
Strahinja Pavlović, Serbian footballer
Strahinja Petrović, Serbian footballer
Strahinja Stanišić, Serbian alpine skier
Strahinja Stojačić, Serbian basketball player

See also
Silvije Strahimir Kranjčević is a 19th-century Croatian poet. ("mir" meaning "peace")

References

Slavic masculine given names
Serbian masculine given names